Glycerol-3-phosphate acyltransferase 3 (GPAT-3) is an enzyme that in humans is encoded by the AGPAT9 gene. GPAT-3 is also known as:

 1-acylglycerol-3-phosphate O-acyltransferase 9 (AGPAT9),
 lysophosphatidic acid acyltransferase theta  (LPAAT-theta), or
 lung cancer metastasis-associated protein 1.

Function 

Glycerol-3-phosphate (G3P) acyltransferases (GPAT; EC 2.3.1.15), such as GPAM and GPAT3 (this enzyme), catalyze the initial step of de novo triacylglycerol (TAG) synthesis by converting glycerol-3-phosphate (G3P) to lysophosphatidic acid (LPA).

References

External links

Further reading